Zombies 2 is a 2020 American musical and dance Disney Channel Original Movie that premiered on Disney Channel on February 14, 2020. A sequel to the 2018 Disney Channel Original Movie Zombies, the film stars Milo Manheim and Meg Donnelly, and features Trevor Tordjman, Kylee Russell, and Carla Jeffery reprising their roles from the first movie, with Chandler Kinney, Pearce Joza, and Baby Ariel joining the cast. The film shows the zombies and cheerleaders, who have mostly since reconciled from the events of the first film, attempting to coexist and assimilate werewolves into the town of Seabrook.

A sequel, Zombies 3, was released in July 2022.

Plot 
Prior to the founding of Seabrook, settlers fought off a group of werewolves for control over an energy artifact, later known as the moonstone.

At the opening of the film, the zombies have reunited with and assimilated into the rest of Seabrook. Zed plans to ask Addison to Prawn, the Seabrook equivalent of Prom, while Addison captains a group of new recruits to compete against veteran cheerleaders coached by Bucky. Soon after, though, Bucky announces his candidacy for class president which means that the cheer captaincy will go to someone else; Addison hopes to succeed Bucky.

The movie then fast-forwards to a bus carrying the cheerleaders enters the nearby forbidden forest, Addison and the cheerleaders spot werewolves, which upon report to the local government, causes the mayor to reinstate anti-monster laws. Zombies are banned from Prawn, so to combat the new laws, Zed decides to run for class president to go to Prawn with Addison.

Meanwhile, the local werewolves' power-granting moonstone necklaces are losing their power. Werewolf prophecy states that a girl with white hair known as the Great Alpha will lead them to this moonstone, so the werewolves enroll at Seabrook to contact Addison. Zed attempts to gain their vote for him by offering them advice on how to assimilate into Seabrook, which the werewolves ignore in favor of embracing their werewolf traits.

Noticing Addison's white hair, Wyatt, a high-ranking werewolf, invites her to their den, where they tell her the prophecy and give her a fully charged moonstone necklace, which they have saved for the Great Alpha. If she is truly a werewolf, wearing it will cause her to transform. The werewolves give her one day to decide, and reveal that the destruction of the power plant will cause the destruction of the moonstone buried underneath it. The next day, Addison shows Zed the necklace, but feeling jealous, Zed secretly takes it. Zed wins his presidential debate against Bucky, but when the Z-band shorts out due to the moonstone, Zed becomes a full zombie, losing the election.

The werewolves head to Seabrook Power and face off against the demolition crew. The werewolves are arrested at the demolition site, but Addison, alerted by a siren at school, arrives with the cheerleaders and zombies, who get the adults to stop the demolition. After the demolition is postponed, Zed reveals to Addison that he took the necklace from her. Angry, she puts on the necklace, but finds out that she's not a werewolf. The device controlling the demolition shorts out, and Seabrook Power is unwillingly demolished.

Prawn night arrives and Zed, as well as the rest of the non-humans, show up to crash Prawn. Zed and Addison make up, however, the ground starts shaking and splits open with a blue glow from the hole. The werewolves realize that the moonstone is not destroyed and enter the hole to find it. The humans and zombies follow to help. They find the moonstone, but a huge boulder blocks the way. Zed removes his Z-band and uses his zombie strength to lift the boulder and allow the others to bring the moonstone out safely. They return to Prawn; Zed and Addison subsequently share their first kiss.

In the final scene, a glowing blue meteor falls from the moon, waking Addison and making her hair glow, though she doesn't notice it.

Cast

Production 
In early 2019, a sequel to Zombies was in production, with returning stars, director, and writers. Pearce Joza, Chandler Kinney, and Ariel Martin joined the cast with Kylee Russell, Trevor Tordjman, Carla Jeffery, James Godfrey, and Kingston Foster reprising their roles from the first film. The film is written by David Light and Joseph Raso, directed by Paul Hoen, and executive produced by Anna Gerb, Paul Hoen, and Joseph Raso. Production on the film began on May 27, 2019, and wrapped in Toronto on July 15, 2019. Scenes were also shot at Rockwood Conservation Area. Mary Pantelidis served as producer.

Release 
Zombies 2 was released on DVD format on May 19, 2020; the DVD release also featured the music video of "The New Kid In Town" performed by Baby Ariel.

Reception

Critical response 
On the review aggregator website Rotten Tomatoes, 100% of 5 critics' reviews are positive, with an average rating of 7.50/10.

Emily Ashby of Common Sense Media rated the movie 4 out of 5 stars, praised the film for the depiction of tolerance and understanding as positive messages, found the characters portrayed by Milo Manheim and Meg Donnelly to be positive role model, and complimented the educational value for the film's approach on social-emotional themes such as body positivity. Rachel Wagner of Rotoscopers gave the film a 3 out of 5 stars rating, praised the performances of the cast and the chemistry between Milo Manheim and Meg Donnelly, while complimenting the musical performances.

Ratings 
During its premiere on February 14, 2020, in the 8:00 PM time slot, Zombies 2 attracted a total of 2.46 million viewers, with a 0.52 rating for people aged 18–49. The sequel performed better than the original among young adults between 18 and 49 years old.

Accolades

Sequel 
A third and final film, Zombies 3, was announced on March 22, 2021. Filming took place in Toronto, beginning on May 31, 2021. The film premiered on Disney+ on July 15, 2022, and was followed by an extended version premiering on Disney Channel on August 12, 2022. The third film involves an alien invasion. On May 20, 2022, RuPaul was announced to have joined the cast as the voice of "The Mothership", described in the official synopsis as "a comedically passive-aggressive UFO".

Notes

References

External links 
 

2020 films
2020 television films
2020s English-language films
2020s monster movies
2020s musical comedy films
2020s teen comedy films
American dance films
American teen musical films
American zombie films
Cheerleading films
Disney Channel Original Movie films
Films directed by Paul Hoen
Films scored by George S. Clinton
Films shot in Toronto
Human-zombie romance in fiction
Musical television films
American werewolf films
2020s American films